Ain't No Time for Women is a Canadian short documentary film, directed by Sarra El Abed and released in 2021. The film centres on a group of women in a hair salon in Tunis, and their reactions to the 2019 Tunisian presidential election.

The film premiered at the 2021 Clermont-Ferrand International Short Film Festival. It had its Canadian premiere at the 2021 Hot Docs Canadian International Documentary Festival, where it won the Betty Youson Award for Best Canadian Short Documentary.

The film was named to TIFF's annual year-end Canada's Top Ten list for 2021.

References

External links
 

2021 films
2021 short documentary films
French-language Canadian films
Canadian short documentary films
Films shot in Tunisia
Films set in Tunisia
Arabic-language Canadian films
2020s Canadian films